Petar Atanasov may refer to:

 Petar Atanasov (footballer) (born 1990), Bulgarian footballer
 Petar Atanasov (linguist) (born 1939), Macedonian linguist of Megleno-Romanian ethnicity